Jeremy Mark Quin (born 24 September 1968) is a British politician who has served as the Member of Parliament (MP) for Horsham since the 2015 general election. A member of the Conservative Party, he served as Minister of State for Crime, Policing and Fire under Prime Minister Liz Truss from September to October 2022. After Truss resigned and Rishi Sunak succeeded her, Quin was appointed to be Paymaster General and Minister for the Cabinet Office.

Early life
Educated at St Albans School, Hertfordshire, Quin went up to Hertford College, Oxford.

After graduating from Oxford University, he joined NatWest Securities, which later merged into Deutsche Bank, and in 2001 Quin became Managing Director of the firm. In 2008 and 2009 he served as Senior Corporate Financial Adviser during the financial crisis.

Quin first stood as a Conservative candidate in Meirionnydd Nant Conwy at the 1997 general election, gaining 3,922 (16%) of the votes cast, coming third behind the Labour and Plaid Cymru candidates. He was shortlisted as a potential Conservative Party candidate in South Suffolk, Bexhill and Battle and Fareham at different elections. From 2010 to 2013, he served as the chairman of Buckingham Conservative Association.

Parliamentary career
Quin was chosen as the Conservative Party's candidate in Horsham in the 2015 general election on 12 March 2015, after the incumbent Conservative MP, Francis Maude, announced he would be stepping down.

In July 2015, he was elected as a member of the Work and Pensions Select Committee, and held this position until October 2016. Quin also served on the Regulatory Reform Select Committee between October 2015 and November 2018, and is a current member of the Selection Committee.

Under Theresa May, Quin was appointed a Lord Commissioner of the Treasury. On 28 July 2019 he was promoted to Comptroller of the Household by Boris Johnson.

Quin campaigned for the "Remain" side in the 2016 Brexit referendum. After the referendum result he voted for the UK to leave the EU.

Quin was appointed Parliamentary Secretary for the Cabinet Office in 2019, at the open of the First Johnson ministry.

Quin was promoted to Minister of State for Defence Procurement in the 2020 British cabinet reshuffle.

In September 2022, he was appointed Home Office Minister.

References

External links

Living people
People from Hertfordshire
People educated at St Albans School, Hertfordshire
Alumni of Hertford College, Oxford
Presidents of the Oxford Union
Conservative Party (UK) MPs for English constituencies
United Kingdom Paymasters General
Members of the Privy Council of the United Kingdom
UK MPs 2015–2017
UK MPs 2017–2019
UK MPs 2019–present
1968 births